Frank Sundström (16 January 1912 – 8 November 1993) was a Swedish actor. He appeared in more than 30 films and television shows between 1933 and 1989. In 1948 he played the lead in the American film Song of My Heart.

Selected filmography
 People of Hälsingland (1933)
 Kanske en gentleman (1935)
Home from Babylon (1941)
 Dangerous Ways (1942)
 Katrina (1943)
 Kungajakt (1944)
 Song of My Heart (1948)
 No Time to Kill (1959)
 Shame (1968)

References

External links

1912 births
1993 deaths
20th-century Swedish male actors
Swedish male film actors
Swedish male television actors
Male actors from Stockholm